Lampropholis elliotensis is a species of skink, a lizard in the family Scincidae. The species is endemic to Queensland in Australia.

References

Skinks of Australia
Endemic fauna of Australia
Reptiles described in 2018
Lampropholis
Taxa named by Sonal Singhal
Taxa named by Conrad J. Hoskin
Taxa named by Patrick J. Couper
Taxa named by Sally Potter
Taxa named by Craig Moritz